Catharina van Holland ( 1280 – after 12 August 1328) was the illegitimate child of Floris V, Count of Holland. She married Zweder van Montfoort. Their son was Hendrik II van Montfoort.

External links
 Biography of Floris V, mentions "Catheryne"

1280s births
1320s deaths
Nobility of the County of Holland
Medieval Dutch women
13th-century women of the Holy Roman Empire
14th-century women of the Holy Roman Empire